Girlfriend Confidential: LA is an American reality television series on Oxygen. The series premiered on September 3, 2012.

Premise
The series follows a group of friends as they navigate through the treacherous waters of the Hollywood entertainment industry.

Episodes

Season 1 (2012)

References

External links

2010s American documentary television series
2012 American television series debuts
2012 American television series endings
English-language television shows